Petra Winzenhöller (born 11 March 1972) is a German former professional tennis player.

Winzenhöller reached a career high singles ranking of 139 in the world, while competing on the professional tour in the 1990s. She won a $75,000 ITF tournament in Plovdiv in 1994, despite starting in the qualifying draw.

A naturopath and physiotherapist, Winzenhöller has worked in that capacity with the Germany Fed Cup team and has also toured as part of Andrea Petkovic's personal team.

ITF finals

Singles: 2 (1–1)

Doubles: 6 (3–3)

References

External links
 
 

1972 births
Living people
German female tennis players